Palian is a district (amphoe) in the southern part of Trang province, Thailand.

Geography
Neighboring districts are (from the east clockwise) Kong Ra, Tamot, and  Pa Bon of Phatthalung province, Khuan Kalong, Manang, and Thung Wa of Satun province, Hat Samran and Yan Ta Khao of Trang Province.

History
Originally named Yong Sata (หยงสตา) or Tan Yong Sata (ตันหยงสตา; Kelantan-Pattani Malay means 'Mango Plum Cape'), it was renamed Palian in 1939.

Palian is believed to have been a seaport since ancient times, some 1,800 years ago, paired with Takola (now's Mueang Trang). When an ancient Greek merchant named Alexander sailed through here in 150, and told the story of his journey to Ptolemy. At that time, Palian was called Palanda.

Administration
The district is divided into 10 sub-districts (tambons), which are further subdivided into 85 villages (mubans). Tha Kham is a township (thesaban tambon) which covers parts of tambon Tha Kham. There are a further 10 tambon administrative organizations (TAO).

Missing numbers are tambons which now form Hat Samran District.

Notable people
Poot Lorlek – Muay Thai fighter in 1970s

References

External links
 District website (Thai only)
 amphoe.com

Districts of Trang province